Monex Financial Services, is a private financial services company with headquarters in County Kerry, Ireland. The company is focused on FinTech solutions and Dynamic Currency Conversion (DCC) however Monex FinTech solutions span a wide range of Foreign Exchange (FX) treasury solutions.

Working with international banks and processors, Monex services include: DCC for the automated teller machines (ATM) industry and Point-of-Sale merchants, multi-currency pricing, FX Rates, Treasury Management and FinTech payment and credit card services.

In 2018, the company processed over $48 billion transactions and DCC was live in 50 countries on 4 Continents. The company operates DCC on ATM networks of over 70,000 ATMs. Monex global office locations include Abu Dhabi,  Bangkok, California, Hong Kong, London and Shanghai.

History 
Monex commenced business in 1997 following the invention of DCC by founder and CEO [Frank Murphy]. The service began its first implementation with Hertz Rent-a-Car.

References

Financial services companies of Ireland